A whistle is a single-note woodwind instrument, in the percussion section of the orchestra, and with many other applications in sport and other fields.

Whistle may also refer to:

Music

Songs 

"Whistle" (Blackpink song), by Blackpink (2016)
 Whistle (band), a 1980s hip-hop band
 "Whistle" (Flo Rida song), 2012
 "Whistle" (Kylie Minogue and múm song), 2013
 "Whistle (While You Work It)", a 2015 song by British recording artist Katy Tiz

Other 

Whistle register, in singing, the highest register of the human voice
 Whistling
Tin whistle or pennywhistle

Literature
 Whistle (novel), a 1978 novel by James Jones, the final volume in his World War II trilogy
 Whistle!, a 1998 manga by Daisuke Higuchi

Film
 The Whistle (film), a 1921 American silent drama film directed by Lambert Hillyer
 Whistle, a 2002 short film by Duncan Jones
 Whistle (2003 film), a 2003 South Indian Tamil film
 Whistle (2013 film), a 2013 South Indian Kannada film
 Bigil, a 2019 Tamil film dubbed into Telugu as Whistle

Science and technology
 Liquid whistle, a device for mixing and emulsification
 Steam whistle
 Train whistle, an audible signaling device on a steam locomotive
 Whistle (unidentified sound)

Places
 Whistle Cove, a cove in South Georgia
 Whistle Lake, a lake in Anacortes, Washington, USA
 Whistle Pass, a snow pass on Alexander Island in Antarctica

People with the surname
 Rob Whistle (born 1961), Canadian ice hockey player

Others
 Whistle (company), a subsidiary of Mars Petcare
 Whistle (organisation), a West Ham United F.C. supporters' pressure group
 Whistle (superhero), a fictional DC Comics character 
 Whistled language
 Whistle Orange Soda, a soft drink made by Vess
 A unit of time used in Indian cooking
 Whistle, or whistle and flute, rhyming slang for suit

See also
 Whistler (disambiguation)
 Whistleblower (disambiguation)
 Whistle Stop (disambiguation)